Edgar Raymond Treadaway (October 31, 1907 – October 12, 1935) was a third baseman in Major League Baseball who played in six games late in the season for the 1930 Washington Senators.

Treadaway died at the age 27 on October 12, 1935, three months after being shot in the leg during a bar fight.

References

External links

1907 births
1935 deaths
1935 murders in the United States
Deaths by firearm in Tennessee
People from Ragland, Alabama
People murdered in Tennessee
Major League Baseball third basemen
Washington Senators (1901–1960) players
Baseball players from Alabama